Comasina  is a district (quarter) of Milan, Italy. It is an area located within Zone 9 of the city.

Districts of Milan